Oxford Gliding Club (OGC) is a UK gliding club, and is one of the oldest still in operation in the UK. Currently it operates from RAF Weston-on-the-Green, north of Oxford. In 2012, the club celebrated its 75th anniversary.

History

Formation 
The pre-war ancestor to the club was the "Oxford University and City Gliding Club" which had its inaugural meeting at Christchurch College on Thursday 2 December 1937. The founders were predominantly Oxford academics, including author and anthropologist Robert Sutherland Rattray, Professor H H Price, philosopher Professor Gilbert Ryle and physicist Professor Frederick Lindemann, 1st Viscount Cherwell (later Lord Cherwell). They were helped in their search for a suitable site by aviator Amy Johnson. Frederick Lindemann went on to become scientific advisor to Winston Churchill and was paymaster general during World War II.

Historical Operations 
Flying began on Saturday, 7 May 1938, at a site known as Cumnor meadow, which is now on the bed of Farmoor Reservoir. The Club fleet consisted of two open primary gliders,  one of which had a streamlined nacelle. Club members had to build an access road to the site, including a bridge over a ditch, and a basic hangar. The famous Austrian gliding pioneer, Robert Kronfeld became manager and CFI (Chief Flying Instructor) of the Club in June 1938. Club pilots and gliders took part in a public Air Show at RAF Upper Heyford in the summer of 1938. The Club moved from Cumnor to the Chiltern ridge at Aston Rowant, close to the Lambert Arms pub, for the 1939 season. The formation of the Oxford Gliding Co. Ltd. dates from 1939, including the original £4,000 share capital which is still on the books to this day. On the outbreak of war in 1939, all recreational aviation ceased, and the club was eventually reformed at Kidlington (London Oxford Airport)in 1951. An increase in powered aircraft activity at Kidlington resulted in the club relocating to RAF Weston-on-the-Green in 1956.

Modern history 
In July 2020, Oxford University Gliding Club returned to RAF Weston-on-the-Green. It operates as an independent organisation, however OGC facilitates its operations by providing the necessary operational capacity. It was a part of OGC until 1970 when it became a separate entity and moved to RAF Bicester under the predecessor to Windrushers Gliding Club, the RAF Gliding and Soaring Association.

Club operations

Whilst the club operates from an RAF airfield, it is not affiliated with nor is it a military organisation. The club operates mainly on weekends and bank holidays, however may occasionally operate on weekdays when the airfield is not otherwise in use, and when there are sufficient members available to commence operations. Like most UK gliding clubs, there are no paid employees and all members (subject to age and regulatory requirements) are trained in the various elements of airfield operation. In addition to the day-to-day operations, the club also undertakes various maintenance tasks including grass-cutting, aircraft inspection as per BGA requirements and general upkeep of the facilities. As part of the agreement with OUGC, members of each club are able to use the fleet of both clubs.

The club's instructors operate under the BGA training system, and do not charge for their time. This is common (but not universal) in gliding, unlike other general aviation areas.

The club uses a self-manufactured winch, powered by Liquefied petroleum gas which can give launches 1400 feet or higher. On windy days, due to the length of some of the launching runs, lightweight gliders can reach heights of up to 2500 feet. The club has recently switched to dyneema cable, away from the traditional steel, which offers a stronger cable at a lighter weight.

Glider fleet 

OGC operates a varied fleet, consisting of both single and dual seat aircraft. In addition to the aircraft that it owns, it has access to the fleet of OUGC as part of the facilities agreement.

References

External links
 Official Oxford Gliding Club Website
 Images of the club fleet on ABPIC
 Gliding in the snow - UK Airshow Review
 British Gliding Association

Gliderports in the United Kingdom
Gliding in England
Sport in Oxfordshire